Anomalopus is a genus of worm-skinks, smallish smooth-scaled burrowing lizards in the family Scincidae. The genus is endemic to the eastern half of Australia. The genus belongs to a clade in the Sphenomorphus group which contains such genera as Ctenotus and the close relatives Eulamprus and Gnypetoscincus (Austin & Arnold 2006).

Species
The following species are recognized as being valid.
Anomalopus leuckartii  – two-clawed worm-skink (eastern Australia)
Anomalopus mackayi,  – five-clawed worm-skink (eastern Australia)
Anomalopus swansoni  – punctate worm-skink (east coastal Australia)
Anomalopus verreauxii  – three-clawed worm-skink

Nota bene: A binomial authority in parentheses indicates that the species was originally described in a genus other than Anomalopus.

References

 (2006). "Using ancient and recent DNA to explore relationships of extinct and endangered Leiolopisma skinks (Reptilia: Scincidae) in the Mascarene islands". Molecular Phylogenetics and Evolution 39 (2): 503–511.  (HTML abstract)

Further reading
Cogger HG (2014). Reptiles and Amphibians of Australia, Seventh Edition. Clayton, Victoria, Australia: CSIRO Publishing. xxx + 1,033 pp. .
Duméril AMC, Duméril AHA (1851). Catalogue méthodique de la collection des reptiles du Muséum d'Histoire Naturelle de Paris. Paris: Gide & Baudry/Roret. 224 pp. (Anomalopus, new genus, p. 185). (in French).
Wilson, Steve; Swan, Gerry (2013). A Complete Guide to Reptiles of Australia, Fourth Edition. Sydney: New Holland Publishers. 522 pp. .

 
Lizard genera
Taxa named by André Marie Constant Duméril
Taxa named by Auguste Duméril